Unclassified is the first album released by the Singaporean singer Derrick Hoh. Different editions of "Unclassified" were released thereafter by the end of 2008. The Taiwanese edition of "Unclassfied", released on 21 November 2008, was named "I'm New, I'm Good, I'm Derrick" to suit the Taiwanese market. The Malaysian edition was released on 6 November 2008. This record featured 11 songs.

Track listing 
 無法歸類
 碰碰愛
 你走天橋 我走地下道
 今天過去
 我舍不得
 咬字
 忘得掉
 我相信
 我的連續劇
 順時針忘紀
 克羅地亞的天空

Celebration Edition
The first repack version of this album was first released on 23 September 2008. This version consist of an additional DVD with 4 music videos.

 無法歸類
 碰碰愛
 妳走天橋 我走地下道
 我舍不得

Final Edition
The final repack version of this album was first released on 26 December 2008. This version consist of an additional AVCD with 1 new music video and 3 versions of a cover single.

 咬字 (Music Video)
 很想你
 很想你 (Missing You Version)
 很想你 (Piano Version)

References

2008 albums
Derrick Hoh albums